Qu'Appelle-Wolseley is a former provincial electoral district  for the Legislative Assembly of the province of Saskatchewan, Canada. This district was created before the 8th Saskatchewan general election in 1934 by combining the constituencies of South Qu'Appelle and Wolseley. Redrawn and renamed "Indian Head-Wolseley" in 1975, the riding was dissolved before the 23rd Saskatchewan general election in 1995.

It is now part of the Indian Head-Milestone and Regina Wascana Plains constituencies.

Members of the Legislative Assembly

Qu'Appelle-Wolseley (1934 – 1975)

Indian Head-Wolseley (1975 – 1995)

Election results

|-

|Conservative
|Stanley Withington Nichols
|align="right"|2,627
|align="right"|30.23%
|align="right"|–

|Farmer-Labour
|John Henry Sturdy
|align="right"|1,932
|align="right"|22.24%
|align="right"|–
|- bgcolor="white"
!align="left" colspan=3|Total
!align="right"|8,689
!align="right"|100.00%
!align="right"|

|-

|Conservative
|Stanley Withington Nichols
|align="right"|3,253
|align="right"|33.82%
|align="right"|+3.59

|- bgcolor="white"
!align="left" colspan=3|Total
!align="right"|9,620
!align="right"|100.00%
!align="right"|

|-

| style="width: 130px" |CCF
|Warden Burgess
|align="right"|4,339
|align="right"|50.51%
|align="right"|-

|Prog. Conservative
|William H. Acres
|align="right"|938
|align="right"|10.92%
|align="right"|-22.90
|- bgcolor="white"
!align="left" colspan=3|Total
!align="right"|8,591
!align="right"|100.00%
!align="right"|

|-

|CCF
|Warden Burgess
|align="right"|3,903
|align="right"|40.54%
|align="right"|-9.97

|- bgcolor="white"
!align="left" colspan=3|Total
!align="right"|9,626
!align="right"|100.00%
!align="right"|

|-

| style="width: 130px" |CCF
|William Wahl
|align="right"|4,076
|align="right"|43.71%
|align="right"|+3.17

|Prog. Conservative
|John H. Frasz
|align="right"|695
|align="right"|7.45%
|align="right"|–

|- bgcolor="white"
!align="left" colspan=3|Total
!align="right"|9,324
!align="right"|100.00%

|-

|CCF
|William Wahl
|align="right"|3,084
|align="right"|33.47%
|align="right"|-10.24

|Prog. Conservative
|Clifford J. Hunt
|align="right"|844
|align="right"|9.16%
|align="right"|+1.71
|- bgcolor="white"
!align="left" colspan=3|Total
!align="right"|9,214
!align="right"|100.00%
!align="right"|

|-

|CCF
|William Wahl
|align="right"|2,527
|align="right"|30.92%
|align="right"|-2.55

|Prog. Conservative
|C. Frederick Hood
|align="right"|1,204
|align="right"|14.73%
|align="right"|+5.57

|- bgcolor="white"
!align="left" colspan=3|Total
!align="right"|8,172
!align="right"|100.00%
!align="right"|

|-

|CCF
|John S. Leier
|align="right"|2,188
|align="right"|27.78%
|align="right"|-3.14

|Prog. Conservative
|Victor E. Horsman
|align="right"|2,164
|align="right"|27.47%
|align="right"|+12.74
|- bgcolor="white"
!align="left" colspan=3|Total
!align="right"|7,877
!align="right"|100.00%
!align="right"|

|-

|NDP
|John S. Leier
|align="right"|1,842
|align="right"|28.10%
|align="right"|+0.32

|Prog. Conservative
|Victor E. Horsman
|align="right"|1,401
|align="right"|21.37%
|align="right"|-6.10

|- bgcolor="white"
!align="left" colspan=3|Total
!align="right"|6,556
!align="right"|100.00%
!align="right"|

|-

| style="width: 130px" |NDP
|Terry Hanson
|align="right"|3,154
|align="right"|44.99%
|align="right"|+16.89

|Prog. Conservative
|Lloyd Avram
|align="right"|1,090
|align="right"|15.55%
|align="right"|-5.82
|- bgcolor="white"
!align="left" colspan=3|Total
!align="right"|7,010
!align="right"|100.00%
!align="right"|

Indian Head-Wolseley

|-

|NDP
|Terry Hanson
|align="right"|2,241
|align="right"|30.74%
|align="right"|-14.25

|Prog. Conservative
|Jack H. Horsman
|align="right"|2,205
|align="right"|30.25%
|align="right"|+14.70
|- bgcolor="white"
!align="left" colspan=3|Total
!align="right"|7,290
!align="right"|100.00%
!align="right"|

|-

| style="width: 130px" |Progressive Conservative
|Doug Taylor
|align="right"|2,893
|align="right"|39.98%
|align="right"|+9.73

|NDP
|Pat Connelly
|align="right"|2,400
|align="right"|33.17%
|align="right"|+2.43

|- bgcolor="white"
!align="left" colspan=3|Total
!align="right"|7,236
!align="right"|100.00%
!align="right"|

|-

| style="width: 130px" |Progressive Conservative
|Doug Taylor
|align="right"|4,251
|align="right"|57.07%
|align="right"|+17.09

|NDP
|Pat Connelly
|align="right"|2,073
|align="right"|27.83%
|align="right"|-5.34

|- bgcolor="white"
!align="left" colspan=3|Total
!align="right"|7,449
!align="right"|100.00%
!align="right"|

|-

| style="width: 130px" |Progressive Conservative
|Doug Taylor
|align="right"|3,976
|align="right"|57.82%
|align="right"|+0.80

|NDP
|Joe Zaba
|align="right"|1,794
|align="right"|26.09%
|align="right"|-1.74

|- bgcolor="white"
!align="left" colspan=3|Total
!align="right"|6,876
!align="right"|100.00%
!align="right"|

|-

| style="width: 130px" |NDP
|Lorne Scott
|align="right"|2,725
|align="right"|39.72%
|align="right"|+13.63

|Prog. Conservative
|Dwight Dunn
|align="right"|2,066
|align="right"|30.12%
|align="right"|-27.70
|- bgcolor="white"
!align="left" colspan=3|Total
!align="right"|6,860
!align="right"|100.00%
!align="right"|

See also
Electoral district (Canada)
List of Saskatchewan provincial electoral districts
List of Saskatchewan general elections
List of political parties in Saskatchewan
Qu'Appelle, Saskatchewan
Wolseley, Saskatchewan

References
 Saskatchewan Archives Board – Saskatchewan Election Results By Electoral Division

Former provincial electoral districts of Saskatchewan